Ndawula Nsobya was Kabaka of the Kingdom of Buganda between 1724 and 1734. He was the nineteenth (19th) Kabaka of Buganda.

Claim to the throne
He was the fifth son of Kabaka Juuko Mulwaana, Kabaka of Buganda, who reigned between 1680 and 1690. His mother was Nandawula Kabengano of the Nsenene clan, the fifth of his father's six wives. He ascended to the throne upon the death of his cousin. He established his capital at Lubaga.

Married life
He is reported to have married seven (7) wives:

 Nabisubi, daughter of Namenyeka of the Mamba clan
 Naggujja, daughter of Mukalo, of the Njovu clan
 Nakikulwe Namirembe, daughter of Kayindi
 Nakidde Luyiga, daughter of Segiriinya, of the Ngo clan
 Nakyomubi, daughter of Gabunga, of the Mamba clan.
 Nampanga, daughter of Gunju, of the Butiko clan
 Nazzaluno, daughter of Walusimbi, of the Ffumbe clan

Issue
Kabaka Ndawula is reported to have fathered ten (10) children; eight (8) sons and two (2) daughters:
 Kabaka Kagulu Tebukywereke Ntambi, Kabaka of Buganda, who reigned between 1734 and 1744, whose mother was Naggujja
 Prince (Omulangira) Musanje Golooba, whose mother was Nakidde Luyiga.
 Prince Musanje Golooba married three wives: (a) Bawuna, daughter of Magunda, of the Ffumbe clan (b) Nabulya Naluggwa, daughter of Lutalo, of the Ndiga clan and (c) Namirembe, daughter of Sematengo, of the Ndiga clan. He fathered four (4) sons: (a) Kabaka Mwanga I Sebanakitta, Kabaka of Buganda, who reigned between 1740 and 1741, whose mother was Nabulya Naluggwa (b) Kabaka Namuggala Kagali, Kabaka of Buganda, who reigned between 1741 and 1750, whose mother was Nabulya Naluggwa (c) Kabaka Kyabaggu Kabinuli, Kabaka of Buganda, who reigned between 1750 and 1780, whose mother was Nabulya Naluggwa and (d) Prince (Omulangira) Kayondo, whose mother was Namirembe. Prince Musanje Golooba was executed on the orders of his half-brother Kabaka Kagulu Tebukywereke for the murder of Prince (Omulangira) Luyenje.
 Kabaka Mawanda Sebanakitta, Kabaka of Buganda, who ruled between 1738 and 1740, whose mother was Nakidde Luyiga
 Kabaka Kikulwe Mawuba, Kabaka of Buganda, who reigned between 1736 and 1738, whose mother was Nakikulwe
 Prince (Omulangira) Segaamwenge
 Prince (Omulangira) Luyenje. He was killed by his half-brother, Prince Musanje.
 Prince (Omulangira) Ndege, whose mother was Nakidde Luyiga
 Prince (Omulangira) Bezzaluno, whose mother was Nazzaluno
 Princess (Omumbejja) Ndege, Nassolo.
 Princess (Omumbejja) Kyomubi, whose mother was Nakyomubi

The final years
Kabaka Ndawula died of old age around 1734, at the Kasajjakaliwano Palace, at Lubaga. He is buried at Musaba, Busiro.

Quotes
"Ndawula himself was a man of peace; he reigned long and had a very large family. The turbulence of Ndawula's numerous sons broke the tranquil atmosphere he had established in the country."
 MM Semakula Kiwanuka, A History of Buganda, 1971

Succession table

See also
 Kabaka of Buganda

References

External links
List of the Kings of Buganda

Kabakas of Buganda
18th-century monarchs in Africa